Hannah or Hanna may refer to:

People, biblical figures, and fictional characters
 Hannah (name), a female given name of Hebrew origin
 Hanna (Arabic name), a family and a male given name of Christian Arab origin
 Hanna (Irish surname) (includes Hannah), a family name of Irish origin

Places

United States 
 Hannah,Georgia
 Hanna City,Illinois
 Hanna,Indiana
 Hanna,Louisiana
 Hannah, Michigan
 Hanna,Missouri
 Hannah, North Dakota
 Hanna,Oklahoma
 Hannah, South Carolina
 Hanna,South Dakota
 Hanna,Utah
 Hanna,West Virginia
 Hanna,Wyoming
 Hannah Run, a stream in Ohio

Elsewhere
 Hanna, Alberta, Canada, a town
 Hannah, a small village in Hannah cum Hagnaby, a civil parish in Lincolnshire, England
 Hana, Iran, a city in Isfahan Province
 Hanna, Lublin Voivodeship, Poland, a village
 Haná (German spelling: Hanna), an ethnic region in Moravia, Czech Republic
 Hannah Island (Greenland)
 Hanna Lake, a lake near Quetta, Pakistan

Ships
 , a destroyer escort acquired by the U.S. Navy during World War II
 , an American naval vessel of the American Revolution
 , various ships

Film and television
 Hanna (film), a 2011 European-American film
 Hanna (soundtrack), the soundtrack of the 2011 film
 Hanna (TV series), a 2019 TV series based on the 2011 film
 Hannah (2017 film), an Italian film
 Hannah (1997 film), an Austrian film
 Hannah, the title character of Hannah Montana, an American TV series
 Hannah, the title character of Hannah and Her Sisters, 1986 film by Woody Allen 
 Hannah, a character in the film 28 Days Later
 Hannah, a fictional art restorer, and best friend of Thomas Bailey in the film Made of Honor
 Hannah, a fictional law student in the film Crazy, Stupid, Love
 Hannah, a fictional ex-employee of Buy More in the action-comedy series Chuck

Music
 Hannah (oratorio), by Christopher Smart with a score composed by John Worgan
 Hannah (Australian singer) (born 1978), Australian pop singer, songwriter and musician
 Hannah (Austrian singer), full name Hannah Hofer, Austrian singer
 Hannah Ild (born 1981), Estonian singer, known by the mononym Hannah
 "Hannah", a song from the album Twice Removed from Yesterday by Robin Trower
 “Hannah”, a song by Ray LaMontagne,(2004) From the album “Trouble.”

Other uses
 Hannah (horse), a racehorse
 Tropical Storm Hanna (disambiguation)

See also
 Hana (disambiguation)
 Anna (disambiguation)
 Han-na
 Hanka (disambiguation)
 Hanno (disambiguation)
 Hannu (given name)
 Hanne
 Hanni (disambiguation)
Hanneke